Rivière is a commune in the Pas-de-Calais department in the Hauts-de-France region of France.

Geography

History
The five hamlets of Bellacourt, Bellacordelle, Brétencourt, Grosville and Le Fermont became the commune of Rivière in 1789.

Population
The inhabitants are called Riviérois.

Places of interest

 The church of St.Vaast, dating from the eighteenth century.
 The eighteenth-century château de Grosville and its parkland.
 Traces of a 13th-century castle at Brétencourt.
 The Commonwealth War Graves Commission cemeteries.

See also
Communes of the Pas-de-Calais department

References

External links

 The CWGC cemetery at Bellacourt
 The CWGC cemetery at Le Fremont
 Official website of the commune of Rivière 

Communes of Pas-de-Calais